The white-collared seedeater has been split into two species:

 Cinnamon-rumped seedeater, Sporophila torqueola
 Morelet's seedeater, Sporophila morelleti

Birds by common name